A plover is a type of wading bird.

Plover may also refer to:

Birds
 Masked lapwing, a related bird species commonly known as "plovers" in Australia

Places
Canada
 Plover Islands, Nunavut

China
 Plover Cove, a cove in Hong Kong

United Kingdom
 Plover Hill, in the Yorkshire Dales

United States
 Plover, Iowa
 Plover, Wisconsin, a village in Portage County
 Plover, Portage County, Wisconsin, a town adjacent to the village
 Plover, Marathon County, Wisconsin, a town
 Plover River, a river in Wisconsin

Other
 HMS Plover, a number of ships of the Royal Navy
 Plover-class gunvessel, a 19th-century class of Royal Navy ships
 MV Plover, a ferry in the US state of Washington
 Plover (1788 ship), a British slave ship
 The Plover Project, an open source stenography engine